Reginald Campbell (1894–1950) was a British writer and former Naval officer in WWI then an assistant forest manager in Siam in the 1920s. His novel Poo Lorn of the Elephants was filmed by Alejandro Jodorowsky in 1980 under the name Tusk. Another novel, Tiger Valley, was filmed in 1936 by Howard Bretherton as The Girl from Mandalay. He described his personal experiences from Thailand in the book Teak-Wallah: The Adventures of a Young Englishman in Thailand in the 1920s.

In his book Teak Wallah, he describes a character called Smith who was his assistant in Muang Ngow - Flight Lieutenant 'Dick' Frederick Murison who almost died from fever in the teak jungle and later served as a bomber pilot in Afghanistan in the late 20s. Orwell may be Mr W. Elder, Forest Manager of Anglo-Siam Forest Company, a heroic figure who lived amongst the elephants of Muang Ngow near Lakon (in the book Nakon) and retired in Riverhead, Kent dying in about 1935. He gives a fairly accurate appraisal of life as an assistant forest manager with its dangers from disease and wild animals while logging teak with elephants.

Campbell also wrote a book about an elephant breeder and trader in Siam in the 1920s, which is a ripping yarn but scarcely believable called "Jungle Nights". The rapturous conclusion is a full on Roman style elephant charge in phalanx formation against the evil Mongol elephant trader who is stampeding a wild herd into his compound that is unintentionally hilarious. Tubby Kenson's character, (a bumbling teak wallah who the hero, Jim Dales (Reggie), takes the gal, Pat Bell from), may be based partly on Fred Murison to whom Reggie handed his signed book to in Dec 1934. Fred was not impressed. The book should be turned into a comedy movie of the period it is so poorly written. He writes in a simple stilted 1920s fashion of heroes and villains, also damsels in distress. He could not be classified as a great writer by any stretch of the imagination. This book is out of print and rare.

He wrote "Cruiser In Action" about his Naval experiences. 'Fear in the Forest' more jungle stuff.

Works 
Note: non-exhaustive list. For novels, the date shown is the oldest found.

 1920  : The Temple of Ghosts in The Illustrated London News of November 24 reissued in Munsey's of November 1928
 1925  : Brown Wife-gold White?
 1926  : Uneasy Virtue
 1927  : Snake Bite in Everybody's Magazine of February
 1927  : Just to Add Interest in Everybody's Magazine of April
 1927  : The White Elephant in The Popular Stories of November 12
 1927  : The Siamese Cat in Everybody's Magazine of November
 1928  : Prestige in Everybody's Magazine of January
 1928  : The Fighting of Giants in Everybody's Magazine of February
 1928  : Even Justice in Everybody's Magazine of March
 1928  : The Shikari in Everybody's Magazine of April
 1928  : The Price of the Tusks in Everybody's Magazine of May
 1928  : Cuthbert in Everybody's Magazine of June
 1928  : The Mankiller in Everybody's Magazine of July 1928
 1928  : The Call of the Jungle in Everybody's Magazine of August
 1928  : The Medicine Man in Munsey's of October
 1928  : The Stolen Teak Logs in Munsey's of December
 1929  : Lone Dog in Munsey's of January
 1929  : Kim Lai in Munsey's of February
 1929  : The Bridge in the Jungle in The Popular Magazine of March 2
 1929  : Thunderstorm in Munsey's of the month of March
 1929  : Tiger in Frontier Stories of August
 1930  : The Elephant King , a jungle novel ( This Animal Is Dangerous )
Published in France for the first time in 1935; Paris: Editions of the "New Critical Review," collection "of Angles' n o 16; translated by Hélène Jeandidier; 253 p. Reissue in 1946, Paris, G.-T. Rageot, "Happy Hours" collection; illustrations by Roger Treille.
 1931  : The Death of the Tiger ( Death in Tiger Valley )
Published in France for the first time in 1936; Paris: Hachette , collection "The Best Foreign Novels"; translated by Marie-Louise Chaulin; 252 p. Reissue in 1948, 1950, Paris, Hachette , collection "  Green Library  ", trad. Marie-Louise Chaulin, illustrations by Mixi; 1952, Hachette, collection of great novelists.
 1935  : Jungle Night
1935  : In the Siamese Forest ( Teak-Wallah ) 1
 Published in France for the 1 st time in 1950; Paris: Hachette, "Youth of the World" collection; translated by Jean Muray  ; 255 p.
 1935  : Poo Lorn the Elephant ( Poo Lorn of the Elephants )
Published in France for the first time in 1935; Paris: Hachette , collection "The Best Foreign Novels"; translated by Marie-Louise Chaulin; 256 p. Reedition in 1946, Paris, Hachette , " Green Library " collection   , translated by M.-L. Chaulin, illustrations by André Hofer; 1952, Hachette, Ideal-Library collection , illustrations by François Batet . ; 1964, daily L'Humanité , published in serial, put in images by Jean Dorville .
 1936  : Adventures in a Teak Jungles in Mine of May
 1937  : Terror in the forest , Fear in the Forest
Published in France for the first time in 1937; Paris: Hachette , collection "The Best Foreign Novels"; translated by Maurice Rémon; 256 p. Reissue in 1947, Paris, " Green Library " collection   , trans. Maurice Rémon, illustrations by Henri Faivre.
 1938  : The Obsession of Katheleen Saunders ( The Haunting of Kathleen Saunders )
Published in France for the 1 st time in 1951, Paris, Librairie des Champs-Elysees , collection "  The Mask  " n o 392, translated by Perrine Vernay; 253 p.
 1939  : Gunroom mess or The Admiralty Regrets
 1939  : The Siamese Lizard ( The Bangkok Murders )
Published in France for the first time in 1946; Paris, Editions Rouff , coll.  "  The Key  " n o 41
 1940  : Cruiser in Action
 1947  : His Majesty the Tiger ( Striped Majesty )
Published in France for the first time in 1956; Paris, Brussels, Editions de l'Amitié, collection "Happy Hours" Nature n o 103; translated by Germaine Guillemot-Magitot, illustrations by R. Dallet; 208 p. Reissue in 1978, Paris: Gallimard, collection Folio junior, translated by Mr. Guillemot-Magitot, illustrations by Bernard Héron, 189 p.
 1947  : Coffin for a Murderer
 1948  : The Abominable Twilight
 1949  : Death by Apparition 2
 1949  : The Elephant Valley ( The Keepers of Elephant Valley )
 Published in France for the first time in 1949; Paris: G.-T. Rageot, "Happy Hours" collection; translated by Germaine Guillemot-Magitot, illustrations by H. Camus; 257 p. Reissues: 1960, 1961, 1965: Paris, Editions of Friendship, "Library of friendship" collection.
 1949  : Tiger! Tiger! in Jungle Stories , winter issue
 1952  : Murder of my Wife
 1952  : Murder she Says

Notes 
A work translated into Spanish under the title Noche en la selva does not correspond to any translation of title in English: is it a work that appears in the list under another title?

Given the large number of authors named Reginald and Campbell, it is not easy to say that all titles are from the same writer. However, the writings of the jungle, Thailand, elephants, tigers are certainly his. Doubt arises when detective novels are found, especially when they are published after death; but they can also be attempts to write in another genre and posthumous editions.

He became popular with the French due to the movie Tusk which was made by the French and considered a very dull film, but got a kind of cult following due to the director.

References

20th-century British writers
1894 births
1950 deaths
British military personnel of World War I
British expatriates in Thailand
20th-century British novelists
British male novelists